The volleyball competition at the 2014 Central American and Caribbean Games was held in Veracruz, Mexico. The tournament was scheduled to be held from 15 to 30 November at the Cordoba Arena.

Medal summary

Women's tournament

Participating teams

Squads

Pool A

|}

|}

Pool B

|}

|}

Final round

Championship bracket

5th to 8th places bracket

Quarterfinals

|}

Classification 5–8

|}

Semifinals

|}

Classification 7–8

|}

Classification 5–6

|}

Classification 3–4

|}

Final

|}

Final standings

Awards

 Most Valuable Player
 
 Best Scorer
 
 Best Outside Spikers
 
 
 Best Middle Blockers
 
 
 Best Opposite Spiker
 

 Best Digger
 
 Best Receiver
 
 Best Libero
 
 Best Setter
 
 Best Server

Men's tournament

Participating teams

Squads

Pool A

|}

|}

Pool B

|}

|}

Final round

Championship bracket

5th to 8th places bracket

Quarterfinals

|}

Classification 5–8

|}

Semifinals

|}

Classification 7–8

|}

Classification 5–6

|}

Classification 3–4

|}

Final

|}

Final standings

Individual awards

 Most Valuable Player
 
 Best Scorer
 
 Best Outside Spikers
 
 
 Best Middle Blockers
 
 
 Best Opposite Spiker
 

 Best Digger
 
 Best Receiver
 
 Best Libero
 
 Best Setter
 
 Best Server

Medal table

References

External links
 NORCECA Website – Men's tournament
 NORCECA Website – Women's tournament

2014 Central American and Caribbean Games events
2014 in volleyball
2014
International volleyball competitions hosted by Mexico